Luke 15 is the fifteenth chapter of the Gospel of Luke in the New Testament of the Christian Bible. The book containing this chapter is anonymous, but early Christian tradition uniformly affirmed that Luke the Evangelist composed this Gospel as well as the Acts of the Apostles. This chapter records three parables of Jesus Christ: the lost sheep, the lost coin and the lost or 'prodigal' son, a trilogy about redemption that Jesus tells after the Pharisees and religious leaders accuse him of welcoming and eating with "sinners".

Text
The original text was written in Koine Greek. This chapter is divided into 32 verses.

Textual witnesses
Some early manuscripts containing the text of this chapter are:
Papyrus 75 (AD 175-225)
Codex Vaticanus (325-350)
Codex Sinaiticus (330-360)
Codex Bezae (~400)
Codex Washingtonianus (~400)
Codex Alexandrinus (400-440)

Murmuring of the Pharisees and scribes

Verse 2
And the Pharisees and scribes complained, saying,
"This Man receives sinners and eats with them."
Eric Franklin suggests that in eating with them, "Jesus is anticipating their inclusion within the kingdom of God", and that the Pharisees' complaint about this was also raised later, in the early church, and "was in fact a subject of disagreement" in the early church.

Parable of the Lost Sheep 

Verses 3–7 record this parable, which appears in two of the canonical gospels of the New Testament, as well as in the non-canonical Gospel of Thomas. According to the Gospels, a shepherd leaves his flock of ninety-nine sheep in order to find the one sheep who is lost. Compared with Matthew's version of this parable, Luke emphasises the shepherd's responsibility for the loss (verse 3: if he loses one of them; in Matthew, one of them goes astray), the unconditional nature of the search, and the joy which was brought about by the sinner's repentance.

Parable of the Lost Coin 

This parable, in verses 8–10, appears only Luke's Gospel. It recounts a story about a woman with ten silver coins (Greek drachmae) losing one. She then lights an oil lamp and sweeps her house until she finds it, rejoicing when she does. The New King James Version notes that married women often wore such coins in a ten-piece garland.

Franklin notes that in both of these stories, the primary narrative about God's search for the lost is supplemented by a comment on repentance (verses 7 and 10), which "appears to have been introduced, not because the movement of the parable itself required it, but because Luke was sensitive to the charge that emphasis upon the gracious outreach of God could underplay the necessity for response on the part of those it met."

Parable of the Prodigal Son 

The Prodigal Son, also known as Two Sons, Lost Son, the Prodigal Father, the Running Father, and the Loving Father, the third and final part of the cycle on redemption, also appears only in Luke's Gospel (verses 11-32). It tells of a father who gives the younger of his two sons his share of the inheritance before he dies. The younger son, after wasting his fortune (the word 'prodigal' means 'wastefully extravagant'), goes hungry during a famine. He then repents and returns home with the intention of begging to be employed and renouncing his kinship to his father. Regardless, the father immediately welcomes him back as his son and holds a feast to celebrate his return. The older son refuses to participate, stating that in all the time the son has worked for the father, he did not even give him a goat to celebrate with his friends. His father reminds the older son that everything the father has is the older son's, but that they should still celebrate the return of the younger son as he has come back to them.

Liturgical usage
In Western Catholic tradition, this parable is usually read on the fourth Sunday of Lent (in Year C), while in the Eastern Orthodox Church it is read on the Sunday of the Prodigal Son.

See also 
Ministry of Jesus
Parables of Jesus
Related Bible parts: Matthew 18

References

External links 
 King James Bible - Wikisource
English Translation with Parallel Latin Vulgate
Online Bible at GospelHall.org (ESV, KJV, Darby, American Standard Version, Bible in Basic English)
Multiple bible versions at Bible Gateway (NKJV, NIV, NRSV etc.)

Gospel of Luke chapters